Streptomyces blastmyceticus is a bacterium species from the genus of Streptomyces which has been isolated from soil in the Chichibu District in Japan. Streptomyces blastmyceticus produces blastmycin.

See also 
 List of Streptomyces species

References

Further reading

External links
Type strain of Streptomyces blastmyceticus at BacDive -  the Bacterial Diversity Metadatabase

blastmyceticus
Bacteria described in 1991